Cyclopinodes elegans is a species of marine copepods in the family Cyclopinidae. It is found in Scotland.

References

External links 

 
 Cyclopinodes elegans at the World Register of Marine Species (WoRMS)

Cyclopoida
Crustaceans described in 1894
Crustaceans of Europe
Firth of Forth